Gustave Stoskopf (8 July 1869 – 6 December 1944) was a French painter, playwright, poet, draughtsman and publisher from Alsace. He graduated from the Académie Julian and the École nationale supérieure des Beaux-Arts. He served as the director of the Théâtre alsacien de Strasbourg. He authored plays in the Alsatian dialect. He was made Chevalier de la Légion d'Honneur in 1931.

The Musée Gustave-Stoskopf in Brumath in the Bas-Rhin department of France is dedicated to Stoskopf's work.

Stoskopf was the father of the prolific French architect Charles-Gustave Stoskopf.

Gallery

References

External links 
 Gustave STOSKOPF (1869 - 1944)  on Éditions Arfuyen
 European Prize for literature and Europäisher Literaturepreis  on EUROBABEL
 Stoskopf Gustave on Univers des arts
 Les 22 œuvres de Gustave Stoskopf on Painting lexicon
 Gustave Stoskopf le peintre 1869 1944 on AbeBooks.fr
 GUSTAVE STOSKOPF Le Peintre - 1869-1944 on Livres Libres
 Gustave Stoskopf (1869-1944) on Alsace- Collection
 12 documents online on Gallica

1869 births
1944 deaths
People from Bas-Rhin
Académie Julian alumni
École des Beaux-Arts alumni
19th-century French painters
20th-century French painters
20th-century French male artists
19th-century French dramatists and playwrights
20th-century French dramatists and playwrights
19th-century French poets
20th-century French poets
French male poets
Painters from Alsace
20th-century French male writers
Chevaliers of the Légion d'honneur
19th-century French male artists